Hera S.p.A (Holding Energia Risorse Ambiente, Energy Resource Environment Holdings) is a multiutility company based in Bologna, Italy. Hera operates in the distribution of gas, water, energy, and waste disposal in the provinces of Bologna, Ferrara, Forlì-Cesena, Modena, Ravenna, Rimini, Pesaro and Urbino, and in some municipalities of Florence and Ancona.

In October 2012, Hera approved the merger with AcegasAps Group, which operates in the cities of Padua  and Trieste. On 1 July 2014 AMGA, which operates in Udine merged with Hera Group.

In 2014, Hera was the number one Italian domestic operator in terms of the amount of waste treated (over 6.4 million tons), in second place for the integrated water cycle (294 million m³), the third larger player in gas distribution (2.6 billion cm) and fourth in the Italian Electricity business in terms of electricity sold (9.1 TWh).

Corporate history
Hera was established in 2002 through the first merger of public utilities in the Emilia-Romagna region, which involved 11 companies.

In 2003, Hera started the process of listing on the Milan Stock Exchange, which led the company to be partly privatized with 38.8% of its present share capital in private sectors. After 2003, Hera started to grow. In over five years, the Group merged with other Italian companies operating in distribution of energy, water and gas, such as Agea, Ecosea, Meta, Geat Distribution Gas, and Sat Inc.

Hera also had many long-term contracts with foreign suppliers over the years that followed. In 2006, Hera signed a memorandum of understanding with Enel, Edison and Sonatrach. The memorandum provided for the purchase of one billion cubic meters a year of natural gas transported through the methane pipeline belonging to Galsi, a partner company of Hera.

In July 2008, Hera acquired Megas Trade, selling gas and electricity in the Urbino area, owned by Marche Multiservices. The transaction formalized the birth of Hera Comm Marche, the commercial branch of the Hera Group for the Marche region, managed by Hera Comm.

On 25 July 2012, approval was given for the merger with Acegas-Aps S.p.A. (Trieste-Padua), which became part of the Hera Group as of 1 January 2013.

On 1 July 2014 AMGA – Azienda Multiservizi S.p.A. merged with Hera Group.

Company profile and organizational structure 
Strategies and activities are mainly carried out by the Holding, which has a leading and coordinating role throughout its seven Divisions: Environment, Services, Sales and Marketing, Fluids Distribution, Large Plants Engineering and Electricity Distribution, and District Heating.

Hera Comm is the trading company of Hera Group, operating in the electricity and gas market throughout Italy. Hera Comm Mediterranea operates exclusively in Southern Italy; Hera Comm Marche, located in Urbino, is the commercial branch of the Hera Group in the Marche region.

Hera has a wide shareholding structure. The structure includes over 118 public institutions, over 700 professional investors, and over 19.000 private shareholders.

The results in terms of EBITDA and net profit achieved by the Hera Group since its establishment have registered continuous growth over the years. Hera follows a dividend distribution policy that rewards Group shareholders; the Municipalities, are the main beneficiaries of Hera’s dividend policy.

Shareholder Base as at 4 July 2022:

 Municipality of Bologna (12,599%)
 Municipality of Imola (7,375%)
 Municipality of Modena (6,863%)
 Municipality of Ravenna (6,470%)
 Lazard Asset Management LLC (5,043%)
 Municipality of Trieste (4,954%)
 Municipality of Padova (4,803%) 
 Municipality of Udine (3,836%)

Current operations
The Hera Group operates in the public utility services sector, pursuing a sustainable management policy.

The Group’s main activities are: management of waste services (waste collection and disposal, waste-to-energy and composting), water services (treatment, purification, sewerage) and energy services (distribution and sale of methane gas and electricity, district heating).

Hera Group EBITDA composition (as at 31 December 2021):

 Waste Management (23.8%)
 Water (21.4%)
 Electricity (11.8%)
 Gas (39.8%)
 Other Services (3%)

Hera has the largest number of waste treatment plants in Italy. The environmental hygiene services provided by Hera Group in 198 municipalities in Emilia-Romagna, Friuli-Venezia Giulia, Marche, Tuscany and Veneto are part of an integrated waste management system. Activities include separated urban waste collection, washing and cleaning roads, pavements and porticos, cleaning up green areas and complementary services such as the reclamation of degraded areas and cleaning up beaches. The high percentage of separate waste collection and disposal in the reference areas makes the Group a major national operator in the field of environmental services:

 waste treated: 6.8 million tonnes
 separated waste collection: 65.3%
 number of plants: 97

Hera Group is one of the largest Italian operators in integrated water service management. With a total network of over 53 thousand km and approximately 1,400 production plants (such as wells), treatment plants and purification plants, 3.6 million citizens receive catchment, treatment, distribution, sewerage and purification services:

 water customers: 1.5 million
 cubic metres of water sold: 291.5 million

Hera is also a major national operator in gas and electricity sectors. Managing networks spanning 20 thousand km, Hera Group distributes natural gas in the provinces of Bologna, Ravenna, Forlì-Cesena, Ferrara, Modena, Rimini, Florence, Padua, Trieste, Gorizia and Udine. Through its subsidiary Marche Multiservizi, it also has a presence in the province of Pesaro-Urbino. 
In Bologna, Imola, Forlì, Cesena, Ferrara, Modena, Ravenna and Padua, the Group also offers district heating services, providing heat to buildings located far away from the point of production. With networks spanning 460 km, Hera serves around 82 thousand apartments. In 2013, its environmentally-friendly technology enabled it to achieve a primary energy saving of more than 34 thousand tonnes of oil equivalent (toe).
Hera also oversees the distribution of electricity through 12 thousand km of grids in 26 municipalities in the
provinces of Modena, Bologna, Ravenna, Gorizia and Trieste, serving a total of around 623 thousand inhabitants.
The Group’s main commitment in this sector is to the implementation of smart grids and the distribution of digital meters. These are designed to ensure the rapid and remote management and exchange of an enormous volume of information about effective electricity consumption between producer, distributor and consumer.

 gas customers: 2.1 million;
 electricity customers: 1,4 million;
 cubic metres of gas sold: 16.2 billion;
 electricity sold: 11.7 TWh.

Competitors and market shares: benchmark by business 
Hera Group can be compared to the other listed Italian multi-utilities. Comparison on operating data by business (waste, water, gas and electricity) also highlights the market shares.

Waste: waste treated 2021 (thousands of tonnes)
 Hera Group 6,766.6
 Iren 3,646
 A2A 3,423
 Acea 1,737

Water: volumes sold 2021 (million of cubic meters)
 Hera Group 291.5
 Iren 175
 A2A 76.4

Gas: volumes sold 2021 (billion of cubic meters)
 Hera Group 16,242.9
 Iren 2,927
 A2A 2,711
 Acea 214

Electricity: electricity sold 2021 (GWh)
 A2A 18,426
 Hera Group 11,714.9
 Acea 8,256
 Iren 7,354

References

External links
 Official site.

Electric power companies of Italy
Oil and gas companies of Italy
Companies based in Bologna
Italian companies established in 2002
Energy companies of Italy
Energy companies established in 2002